Attero Dominatus is the second studio album by Swedish heavy metal band Sabaton, as well as the first to feature keyboardist Daniel Mÿhr. The album reached 16th place on the Swedish album charts, remaining in the listings for seven weeks.

A video for the title track was shot in Umeå, Sweden, by Nocturnal Rites' drummer Owe Lingvall. For the recording, the band wore camouflage gear, and singer Joakim Brodén donned a vest with metal plates, both features which came to be part of the band's regular stage gear from that point on.

In 2010, the album was re-released on German label Nuclear Blast with five bonus tracks, under the title Attero Dominatus Re-Armed.

Lyrics 
As with the Primo Victoria album, the lyrics on Attero Dominatus deals with different war subjects. "Nuclear Attack" deals with the atomic bombings of Hiroshima and Nagasaki, "Rise of Evil" with the rise of the Third Reich and Adolf Hitler. "We Burn" deals with the Bosnian genocide from the perspective of Radovan Karadžić and other perpetrators of the massacre. The song "Back in Control" deals with the Falklands War. "In the Name of God" is about terrorism, especially religious terrorism.

Track listing

Personnel
 Joakim Brodén – vocals
 Rickard Sundén – guitars
 Oskar Montelius – guitars
 Pär Sundström – bass
 Daniel Mullback – drums
 Daniel Mÿhr – keyboards
 Christian Eriksson – backing vocals and screams on "Metal Crüe"

Release history

References

2006 albums
Nuclear Blast albums
Sabaton (band) albums